Benjamin Tahirović (born 3 March 2003) is a Bosnian professional footballer who plays as a midfielder for  club Roma and Bosnia and Herzegovina national team.

Club career

Early career
Tahirović started his career with Swedish side FC Djursholm before signing with Vasalunds IF in 2020, playing in 26 Ettan games during the 2020 season as Vasalund finished first in Ettan Norra and secured promotion to Superettan.

Roma
In February 2021, Tahirović signed for Roma in the Italian Serie A. He made his Serie A debut for Roma against Torino on 13 November 2022 as a substitute.

International career
Benjamin Tahirović was first called up whit the Bosnia and Herzegovina national team for the UEFA Euro 2024 qualifying games against Iceland on 23 March and Slovakia on 26 March 2023.

Personal life
Tahirović's parents are originally from Sarajevo, Bosnia and Herzegovina. He is eligible to play for both Sweden and Bosnia and Herzegovina, although he has stated that he wishes to play for his parents' native country.His wishes got granted by Faruk Hadžibegić, he called Tahirovic up to play for the Bosnian national team, where they will play against Slovakia and Iceland.

Honours
Vasalunds IF
Ettan Norra: 2020

References

External links

2003 births
Living people
Swedish people of Bosnia and Herzegovina descent
Citizens of Bosnia and Herzegovina through descent
Swedish footballers
Swedish expatriate footballers
Bosnia and Herzegovina footballers
Bosnia and Herzegovina expatriate footballers
Vasalunds IF players
A.S. Roma players
Superettan players
Serie A players
Expatriate footballers in Italy
Swedish expatriate sportspeople in Italy
Bosnia and Herzegovina expatriate sportspeople in Italy